Snawdoun Herald of Arms in Ordinary is a current Scottish herald of arms in Ordinary of the Court of the Lord Lyon.

The office was first mentioned in 1443 and the title is derived from a part of Stirling Castle which bore the same name. The previous Snawdoun Herald of Arms to serve retired in 1883.

The office was last held by Elizabeth A. Roads, former Lyon Clerk and Keeper of the Records for the Court of the Lord Lyon in Edinburgh. She was appointed to this post on the 17 December 2010, and retired in 2021.

The badge of office is Issuant from battlements Proper a unicorn’s head erased Argent, horned and crined and grasping in his mouth the sword Excalibur Or all ensigned of the Crown of Scotland Proper. The granting of this badge completed the devising of badges for all the ordinary and regularly used extraordinary officer of arms titles.

Holders of the office

See also
Officer of Arms
Herald
Court of the Lord Lyon
Heraldry Society of Scotland

References

External links
The Court of the Lord Lyon



Court of the Lord Lyon
Offices of arms